Strumpet City is a 1969 historical novel by James Plunkett set in Dublin, Ireland, around the time of the 1913 Dublin Lock-out. In 1980, it was adapted into a successful TV drama by Hugh Leonard for RTÉ, Ireland's national broadcaster. The novel is an epic, tracing the lives of a dozen characters as they are swept up in the tumultuous events that affected Dublin between 1907 and 1914.

The Risen People
The novel's roots date from 1954, when Plunkett's radio play Big Jim was produced by Radio Éireann, with Jim Larkin the titular hero. In 1958, it was expanded into a gloomier and more stylized stage play, The Risen People, staged at the Abbey Theatre. Kathleen Heininge characterises it as a dry work which read as "pure propaganda for a socialist agenda".  When Hutchinson requested a novel about James Connolly from Plunkett, he instead reworked the play again; Connolly does not feature in Strumpet City, published in 1969. The Risen People was revived and revised in 1977 for the Project Arts Centre and Jim Sheridan. A 2013–14 revival at the Abbey included "the Noble Call", a speech in response to the play's themes from a different public figure at each performance. Panti Bliss' speech on LGBT rights in Ireland at the closing performance attracted media attention.

Reception

It was immensely popular when it was published. The writing is direct and powerfully evokes the over-population, the terrible poverty and the peculiar intimacy of pre-independence Dublin. One theme is the essential goodness of people and the tenderness which survives the brutality of deprivation. The popularity of the novel also owed something to events in Ireland in the early 1970s, as The Troubles made the more traditional iconography of the insurrectionary period troublesome, while economic stagnation and social crisis fostered empathy for the former Dublin of tenements, working class heroes, and vagrant balladeers.

In 2013 Dublin City Libraries chose Strumpet City as its 'One City One Book' book of the year, in commemoration of the centenary of the 1913 Lockout.

On November 5, 2019, the BBC News listed Strumpet City on its list of the 100 most influential novels.

References

External links
 Strumpet City is discussed in an obituary for James Plunkett in the Irish Independent
 Eileen Battersby asks: "Is Strumpet City the great Irish novel?" in The Irish Times
 [http://www.irishtimes.com/culture/books/strumpet-city-the-impossible-irish-novel-1.1343043?mode=print&ot=example.AjaxPageLayout.ot 'Strumpet City': the impossible Irish novel] Edited introduction by Fintan O'Toole to new edition of Strumpet City''

1969 novels
Culture in Dublin (city)
History of Dublin (city)
Irish historical novels
Novels set in Dublin (city)
Hutchinson (publisher) books
20th-century Irish novels